Frontenhausen is a municipality in the district of Dingolfing-Landau in Bavaria in Germany. It is the filming location for the 2013 crime film .

References

Dingolfing-Landau